Moschella is a surname. Notable people with the surname include:

Domenico Moschella ( 1948–2015), Canadian politician
William Moschella (born 1968), American lawyer